Habrosyne is a genus of moths belonging to the family Drepanidae. It was first described  by Jacob Hübner in 1816.

Species
Habrosyne albipuncta (Wileman, 1911)
Habrosyne albipuncta angulifera (Gaede, 1930)
Habrosyne armata Moore, 1882
Habrosyne aurorina (Butler, 1881)
Habrosyne costalis Wileman, 1921
Habrosyne dentata Werny, 1966
Habrosyne dieckmanni (Graeser, 1888)
Habrosyne fraterna Moore, 1888
Habrosyne indica (Moore, 1867)
Habrosyne gloriosa (Guenée, 1852)
Habrosyne intermedia (Bremer, 1864)
Habrosyne intermedia conscripta Warren, 1912
Habrosyne obscura Roepke, 1944
Habrosyne plagiosa Moore, 1882
Habrosyne pterographa (Poujade, 1887)
Habrosyne pyritoides (Hufnagel, 1766)
Habrosyne sanguinea Moore, 1882
Habrosyne scripta (Gosse, 1840)
Habrosyne sumatrana Werny, 1966
Habrosyne violacea (Fixsen, 1887)
Habrosyne violacea argenteipuncta Hampson, 1893

References

Thyatirinae
Drepanidae genera